Arlene Voski Avakian (born 1939) is an Armenian-American academic specializing in women's studies and food history.

Avakian came to the University of Massachusetts Amherst as a graduate student, helping to found the Women's Studies Program. She later joined the faculty at what grew into the university's Department of Women, Gender, and Sexuality Studies. She retired from UMass Amherst in 2011.

Avakian's papers are held in the university's archives collection.

Works
 Lion woman's legacy: an Armenian-American memoir, New York: Feminist Press at the City University of New York, 1992
 (ed.) Through the kitchen window: women explore the intimate meanings of food and cooking, Boston: Beacon Press, 1997
 (with Barbara Haber) From Betty Crocker to feminist food studies: critical perspectives on women and food, Amherst: University of Massachusetts Press, 2005

References

External links
 Papers

1939 births
Living people
Women's studies academics
University of Massachusetts Amherst alumni
University of Massachusetts Amherst faculty
American writers of Armenian descent
American food writers
Women food writers